Myshimarina (Marina) Papaelia  (born c. 1931) was the first runner-up of Miss Egypt 1953. Papelia was sent to represent Egypt at Miss World 1953 when the winner, Antigone Costanda was unable to participate in the pageant. Papaelia finished at third place.

According to Eric Morley's 1967 book, "The Miss World Story", when Antigone Costanda won the Miss World pageant the following year, she claimed her victory was also a victory for Marina Papaelia.

References

Living people
Miss Egypt winners
Miss World 1953 delegates
People from Alexandria
1930s births
Egyptian people of Greek descent